Bernard Comment (born 20 April 1960) is a Swiss writer, translator, scriptwriter, and publisher of books.

Early life
Bernard Comment was born in Porrentruy, Switzerland, on 20 April 1960. He is a son of the artist Jean-François Comment. His elder brother Gerard is the proprietor of a record store Collector Shop in his hometown.

Education
Comment studied Literature at the University of Geneva under Jean Starobinski and at the School for Advanced Studies in the Social Sciences in Paris under Roland Barthes.

Career
Comment moved to Tuscany, where for four years he taught at the University of Pisa. He worked as a sports journalist, before moving to Paris to join as a research fellow at the School for Advanced Studies in the Social Sciences.

Literary
He published his first novel L'ombre de mémoire in 1990. Between 1993 and 1994, he was awarded a residential fellowship at the Villa Médicis, which inspired a tract against this kind of State-supported grants.

Comment has translated several books of Antonio Tabucchi into French.

In 2005, he succeeded Denis Roche as director at Fiction & Cie, and was appointed president of the Commission of the Novel at the Centre national du livre, which he held till 2008.

In 2010, with Stanley Buchthal, he edited Fragments, a collection of intimate writings, poems and letters of Marilyn Monroe.

Film and broadcasting
Along with Alain Tanner, he co-wrote the screenplays for the films Fourbi (1996), Requiem (1998), Jonas et Lila, Til Tomorrow (1999), Paul s'en va (2004). He also created with Bertrand Theubet, Le pied dans la fourmilière (1998) based on one of his novels.

He was a member of the international jury at the Locarno International Film Festival (1996) and Fribourg International Film Festival (1998).

In 1999, he was appointed as director of fiction at France Culture.

Other
In the 1980s, Comment was a secretary of the Swiss Association of Football Players.

From October 2011, he has been an advisor of programming at Arte.

Awards and honours

 1990: Prix Lipp Suisse for L'ombre de mémoire
 1990: Prix de la République et Canton du Jura
 1993: Prix Antigone for Allées et venues
 1995: Award of Distinction of the Commission of French literature of the canton of Bern
 2005: Award of the Canton of Bern for Un Poisson hors de l'eau
 2010: Ordre des Arts et des Lettres
 2011: Prix Goncourt de la Nouvelle for Tout passe

Bibliography

Novels
 L'Ombre de mémoire, éditions Christian Bourgois, 1990 & Folio, 1999 (English: The Shadow of Memory)
 Allées et venues, éditions Christian Bourgois, 1992
 Florence, retours, éditions Christian Bourgois, 1994 & Éditions Gallimard|Folio, 2000
 Le Colloque des bustes, éditions Christian Bourgois, 2000 & Éditions Gallimard|Folio, 2002
 Un Poisson hors de l'eau, Éditions du Seuil, 2004 & Éditions Points, 2007
 Triptyque de l'ongle, Joca Seria, 2008

Essays and stories

Collections
 Roland Barthes, vers le Neutre, éditions Christian Bourgois, 1991
 Le XIXe siècle des panoramas, Adam Biro, 1993
 Les fourmis de la gare de Berne, Editions Zoe, 1996
 L'Ongle noir, Éditions Mille et une nuits, 1997
 Éclats cubains, with photographs by Jean-Luc Cramatte, Verticales/Grimoux, 1998
 Die Frauen der Antike, with Anselm Kiefer, éditions Yvon Lambert, 1999.
 The Panorama, Reaktion Books (London) and Abrams (New York).
 Même les oiseaux, éditions Christian Bourgois, 1998 & J'ai lu, 2000
 Doucet de fonds en combles, trésors d'une bibliothèque d'art, Herscher, 2004
 Entre deux, une enfance en Ajoie, Biro Editeur, 2007

List of stories

As editor

Translations
 Rêves de rêves, by Antonio Tabucchi. (1994)
 Récits complets : Le Jeu de l'envers – Petits malentendus sans importance – L'Ange noir, by Antonio Tabucchi. (1995)
 Il se fait tard de plus en plus tard, by Antonio Tabucchi. (2002)

References

External links 
 

1960 births
Living people
20th-century Swiss novelists
21st-century Swiss novelists
French publishers (people)
Meanjin people
Officiers of the Ordre des Arts et des Lettres
People from Porrentruy
Prix Goncourt de la nouvelle recipients
Swiss male novelists
Swiss male short story writers
Swiss short story writers
Swiss writers in French
20th-century male writers
21st-century male writers